Dean Keener (born September 18, 1965) is the former head coach for the men's basketball team at James Madison University. He is a 1988 graduate of Davidson College where he served as a team captain and played on Davidson's 1986 NCAA Tournament team.  Keener was hired on April 1, 2004.  Keener previously held coaching positions at Drake University, Southern California, Virginia Tech, SMU, and Georgia Tech. Keener played an instrumental role in recruiting and developing many of the players on the 2004 national runner-up Georgia Tech squad. Keener resigned from his coaching position at JMU on February 22, 2008. After his resignation, he continued to coach for the remainder of the 2008 season. During his 20-year coaching career, he coached and/or recruited 12 players that played in the NBA, including Chris Bosh, Jarrett Jack, Anthony Morrow and Will Bynum. He is currently a color analyst for ESPN and CBS Sports Network.

Dean and his wife Meg have two children, Julia and Kyle.

References

1965 births
Living people
Basketball coaches from Ohio
Basketball players from Akron, Ohio
College men's basketball head coaches in the United States
Davidson Wildcats men's basketball players
Drake Bulldogs men's basketball coaches
Georgia Tech Yellow Jackets men's basketball coaches
James Madison Dukes men's basketball coaches
People from Tallmadge, Ohio
SMU Mustangs men's basketball coaches
USC Trojans men's basketball coaches
Virginia Tech Hokies men's basketball coaches